The 3rd (Auckland) Mounted Rifles was formed on March 17, 1911. They were mobilised during the First World War as a squadron of the Auckland Mounted Rifles Regiment. They served in the Middle Eastern theatre of World War I and first saw action during the Battle of Gallipoli.
As a part of the larger New Zealand Mounted Rifles Brigade (of the ANZAC Mounted Division) they went on to serve in the Sinai and Palestine Campaign.

Great War Battles 
Battle of Gallipoli
Battle of Romani
Battle of Magdhaba
Battle of Rafa
First Battle of Gaza
Second Battle of Gaza
Third Battle of Gaza
Battle of Beersheba
Battle of Megiddo (1918)

Between the Wars
They were renamed the 3rd New Zealand Mounted Rifles (Auckland) in 1921. This was later changed to Auckland (East Coast) Mounted Rifles, which became part of the 1st Armoured Regiment on 29 March 1944.

Alliances
 – 3rd The King's Own Hussars

References

Military units and formations established in 1911
Military units and formations disestablished in 1921
Cavalry regiments of New Zealand
Military units and formations of New Zealand in World War I
New Zealand in World War I
History of the Auckland Region
1911 establishments in New Zealand